This is a list of English prepositions.

Prototypical prepositions
The following are single-word prepositions that can take a noun phrase complement following the preposition. Prepositions in this section may also take other kinds of complements in addition to noun phrase complements. Prepositions marked with an asterisk can be used transitively or intransitively; that is, they can take noun phrase complements (e.g., he was in the house) or not (e.g., he was in).

 a
 aboard*
 about*
 abt. (written abbreviation)
 above*
 abreast
 absent
 across*
 after*
 against*
 along*
 aloft*
 alongside*
 amid
 amidst
 mid
 midst
 among
 amongst
 anti
 apropos*
 around*
 round*
 as
 aslant
 astride
 at
 @ (written alternative)
 atop
 ontop (nonstandard)
 bar
 barring
 before*
 B4 (written abbreviation)
 behind*
 below*
 beneath*
 neath
 beside
 besides*
 between*
 'tween
 beyond*
 but
 by*
 chez
 circa
 c., ca. (abbreviations)
 come
 concerning
 contra
 counting
 cum
 despite
 spite (abbreviation)
 down*
 during
 effective
 ere
 except
 excepting
 excluding
 failing
 following
 for
 4 (abbreviation)
 from
 in*
 including
 inside*
 into
 less
 like
 minus
 modulo
 mod (abbreviation)
 near*
 nearer (comparative)
 nearest (superlative)
 next 
 notwithstanding* (also postpositional) 
 of
 o' (written alternative; informal)
 off*
 offshore
 on*
 onto
 opposite
 out
 outside*
 over*
 o'er
 pace
 past*
 pending
 per
 plus 
 post
 pre
 pro
 qua
 re
 regarding
 respecting
 sans
 save
 saving
 short
 since*
 sub
 than
 through*
 thru (informal)
 throughout* 
 thruout (simplified spelling)
 till
 times
 to*
 t' (abbreviation)
 2 (abbreviation)
 touching (archaic)
 toward, towards 
 under*
 underneath*
 unlike
 until
 unto (poetic)
 up*
 upon
 versus
 vs., v. (abbreviations)
 via
 vice (formal)
 vis-à-vis (formal)
 wanting
 with
 w/, w. (abbreviation)
 c̄ (abbreviation in prescriptions)
 within*
 w/i (abbreviation)
 without*
 'thout
 w/o (abbreviation)

Intransitive prepositions 
The following are single-word intransitive prepositions. This portion of the list includes only prepositions that are always intransitive; prepositions that can occur with or without noun phrase complements (that is, transitively or intransitively) are listed with the prototypical prepositions. Note that dictionaries and grammars informed by concepts from traditional grammar may categorize these intransitive prepositions as adverbs.

abroad
adrift
aft
afterward(s)
ahead
apart
ashore
aside
away
back
backward(s)
beforehand
downhill
downstage
downstairs
downstream
downward(s)
downwind
east
eastward(s)
forth
forward(s)
heavenward(s)
hence
henceforth
here
hereby
herein
hereof
hereto
herewith
home
homeward(s)
indoors
inward(s)
leftward(s)
north
northeast
northward(s)
northwest
now
onward(s)
outdoors
outward(s)
overboard
overhead
overland
overseas
rightward(s)
seaward(s)
skyward(s)
south
southeast
southward(s)
southwest
then
thence
thenceforth
there
thereby
therein
thereof
thereto
therewith
together
underfoot
underground
uphill
upstage
upstairs
upstream
upward(s)
upwind
west
westward(s)
when
whence
where
whereby
wherein
whereto
wherewith

Conjunctive prepositions 
The following are single-word prepositions that take clauses as complements. Prepositions marked with an asterisk in this section can only take non-finite clauses as complements. Note that dictionaries and grammars informed by concepts from traditional grammar may categorize these conjunctive prepositions as subordinating conjunctions.

after
although
as
at*
because
before
beside*
besides*
between*
by*
considering
despite*
except
for
from*
given
granted
if (conditional sense)
into*
lest
like
notwithstanding
now
of*
on*
once
provided
providing
save
seeing
since
so (purpose or result sense)
supposing
than
though
till
to*
unless
until
upon*
when
whenever
where
whereas
wherever
while
whilst
with*
without*

Postpositions 
The following are postpositions, prepositions whose complements typically precede them. Note that some grammars classify prepositions and postpositions as different kinds of adpositions while other grammars categorize both under the heading of the more common variety in the language.
ago
apart
aside
aslant (archaic)
away
hence
notwithstanding (also prepositional)
on (usually prepositional but occurs in phrases like "ten years on")
over (usually prepositional but occurs in phrases like "the world over")
short (also prepositional)
through (usually prepositional but occurs in phrases like "the whole day through")

Complex prepositions
The following are prepositions that consist of multiple words. They are categorized according to their structure.

Preposition + preposition

 according to
 across from
 ahead of
 along with
 apart from
 as for
 as from (formal)
 as of
 as per
 as regards
 as to
 aside from
 away from
 back to
 because of
 counter to
 except for
 in between
 instead of (informal)
 near to
 next to
 opposite of
 out from
 out of
 outside of
 owing to
 pertaining to
 round about
 up against
 up to

Preposition + (article) + noun + preposition
English has many idiomatic expressions that act as prepositions that can be analyzed as a preposition followed by a noun (sometimes preceded by the definite or, occasionally, indefinite article) followed by another preposition. Common examples include:

 at the behest of
 at the expense of
 at the hands of
 at (the) risk of
 at variance with
 by dint of
 by means of
 by virtue of
 by way of
 for (the) sake of
 for lack of
 for/from want of
 in accordance with
 in addition to
 in case of
 in charge of
 in compliance with
 in conformity with
 in contact with
 in exchange for
 in favor of
 in front of
 in lieu of
 in (the) light of
 in line with
 in place of
 in point of
 in quest of
 in relation to
 in/with regard to
 in/with respect to
 in return for
 in search of
 in spite of
 in step with
 in touch with
 in terms of
 in the name of
 in view of
 on account of
 on behalf of
 on (the) grounds of
 on the part of
 on top of
 with a view to
 with the exception of

Other complex prepositions
The following complex prepositions do not follow either of the common structures for complex prepositions.

 à la (or a la)
 as soon as
 as well as
 close to
 due to
 far from
 in case
 other than
 per pro
 prior to
 pursuant to
 rather than
 regardless of
 subsequent to
 such as

Archaic, dialectal, or specialized
The following prepositions are not widely used in Present-Day English. Some, such as bating and forby, are archaic and typically only used to convey the tone of a bygone era. Others, such as ayond and side, are generally used only by speakers of a particular variety of English. Yet others are generally only used in specialized contexts, such as abaft in nautical settings and dehors in law.

Prototypical prepositions

 abaft (nautical)
 abating (obsolete)
 abeam (nautical)
 ablow (Scottish and Irish English)
 aboon (rare)
 abouts (regional, U.S.)
 acrost (regional, Australia, England, and U.S.)
 adown (archaic; poetic; rare)
 a-eastell (obsolete; regional, Scotland)
 afore (archaic; regional, Southern and Midland U.S.; nautical)
 afornent (obsolete; regional, Scotland)
 afront (obsolete; regional)
 afterhand (rare; regional)
 again (regional)
 ahind (dialectal; archaic)
 ajax (Polari)
 alength (obsolete)
 alongst (regional, Scotland and U.S.) 
 aloof (obsolete)
 alow (obsolete; regional, Scotland)
 amell (rare; regional, Northern England)
 amidmost (poetic)
 anear (archaic; regional)
 aneath (poetic; regional, Scotland)
 anent (obsolete; rare; regional, Scotland and Yorkshire)
 anewst (obsolete)
 anunder (regional, Northern England, Ireland, and Scotland)
 askant (archaic)
 asklent (regional, Northern England, Northern Ireland, and Scotland)
 astern (nautical)
 athwart (obsolete; dialectal; nautical)
 atour (regional, Scotland)
 atter (regional, Northern England, Southern U.S.)
 atween (archaic; dialectal)
 atwixt (archaic; dialectal)
 a-weather (nautical; obsolete)
 a-west (obsolete; regional, Scotland)
 awestell (obsolete; regional, Scotland)
 ayond, ayont (dialectal)
 bating (archaic)
 bedown (obsolete)
 be-east (obsolete; regional, Scotland)
 beforrow (obsolete)
 behither (obsolete)
 ben (dialectal, Scots)
 benorth (obsolete; regional, Scotland)
 besouth (obsolete; regional, Scotland)
 betwixt (archaic; poetical; dialectal)
 'twixt (obsolete)
 bewest (obsolete; regional, Scotland)
 bongre (obsolete)
 bout (regional)
 bove (poetic; regional)
 'cept (colloquial)
 contrair (obsolete)
 contrary (obsolete)
 cross (dialectal; poetic)
 dehors (law; rare)
 dot (mathematics)
 durante (obsolete)
 effore (obsolete)
 emong, emonges(t) (obsolete)
 endlong, endlonges, endlongs (dialectal; obsolete)
 enduring (obsolete; rare, South and South Midland U.S.)
 ensuing (obsolete)
 even-forth (obsolete)
 ex (commerce)
 excepted (obsolete)
 extra (rare)
 fae (dialectal, Scots)
 forby(e) (archaic)
 fore (regional, U.S.)
 fornent, fornenst (obsolete; regional, Northern England and Scotland)
 foregain, foregains, foregainst (obsolete; regional, Scotland)
 forne (obsolete)
 forout, forouten (obsolete)
 forrow (obsolete; regional, Scotland)
 forth (archaic)
 fro (dialectal, Scots)
 fromward, fromwards (obsolete)
 froward (archaic)
 furth (Scotland)
 gain (obsolete)
 gainst (informal; poetic)
 gainward (obsolete)
 gin (regional, Northern England, Ireland, and Scotland)
 half-way, halfway  (obsolete)
 hent (obsolete)
 inboard (nautical)
 incontrair (obsolete; regional, Scotland)
 indurand (obsolete; regional, Scotland)
 inmid, inmiddes
 inter (obsolete; rare)
 inthrough (regional, Scotland)
 intil, intill (rare; dialectal, Scots)
 inwith (obsolete; regional, Scotland)
 i'th' (archaic; poetic; regional)
 'long (regional) 
 longs (obsolete; regional, Scotland)
 longst (obsolete; poetic)
 longways (rare)
 malgrado (obsolete)
 malgré (archaic; rare)
 mang (Devon)
 maugre (archaic)
 midmost (obsolete)
 mids (obsolete)
 midward (obsolete)
 midway (rare)
 'mong (poetic or dialectal)  
 'mongst (poetic or dialectal)
 more (obsolete)
 moreover (obsolete)
 moyening (obsolete)
 natheless, nathless (archaic; literary; rare)
 nearabout, nearbout (colloquial; regional)
 nearby (regional, Scotland)
 nearhand (regional, Northern England, Northern Ireland, and Scotland)
 'neath (poetic)
 nigh, anigh, anighst (archaic of regional)
 nigh-hand (regional, Northern and Midland England, Ireland, and Scotland)
 nobbut (rare; regional, Northern England)
 non-obstant (obsolete)
 notwithstand (obsolete)
 noughtwithstanding (obsolete)
 offa (colloquial; regional)
 offen (regional)
 only (regional, Southern U.S. and South Midland U.S.)
 or (archaic)
 otherside (obsolete; regional, Scotland)
 outcept (obsolete)
 outen (regional)
 out-over (regional, Scotland)
 outta (colloquial; regional, U.S.)
 out-taken (obsolete)
 out-taking (obsolete)
 out-through (regional, Scotland)
 outwith (regional, Scotland)
 overcross (archaic; rare)
 over-right (regional, Scotland, Southern England, Ireland, Newfoundland)
 overthorter (obsolete; regional, Scotland)
 overthwart (archaic; regional, Eastern, Midland, and Northern England)
 overtop (regional, North America)
 pan (regional, Jamaica)
 pass (regional, Caribbean)
 pon (archaic; regional, Caribbean and Southwestern England)
 quoad (law)
 reserved (obsolete)
 reserving (obsolete)
 sauf (archaic) 
 seen (obsolete)
 sen (rare; regional, Northern England and Scotland)
 senza (music)
 side (dialectal, African-American English)
 sidelings (obsolete)
 sidelong (obsolete)
 sides (dialectal, African-American English)
 sin (dialectal, Northern England English and Scots)
 sineth (obsolete)
 sith (archaic')
 sithen (obsolete)
 sithence (obsolete)
 ter (regional)
 thorough (archaic; poetic; rare)
 thorter (regional, Scotland)
 thwart (archaic; nautical; poetic)
 thwart-over (dialectal; obsolete)
 tiv (dialectal, Northern England English)
 touchant (obsolete)
 transverse (obsolete)
 traverse (obsolete)
 twel(l), twill (dialectal, African-American English)
 ultra (obsolete; poetic)
 umbe (obsolete)
 unneath (obsolete; poetic)
 upo’ (dialectal, Northern England English and Scots)
 upside (slang)
 upsy, upsees (archaic; obsolete)
 uptill
 utouth (obsolete; regional, Scotland)
 wid (dialectal, African-American English)
 withinside (archaic; dialectal)
 withoutside (obsolete; rare)
 wiv (dialectal, African-American English and Cockney)
 ymong (obsolete)
 yond (obsolete)
 yonside (regional, South Midland U.S.)

Intransitive prepositions

aground (archaic; poetic)
bush (regional, Australia)
hereat (archaic; obsolete)
herefrom (rare)
hereon (rare)
hither (archaic)
thereat (archaic; formal)
therefrom (archaic; formal)
thereon (archaic; formal)
thither (archaic)
whereat (archaic; formal)
wherefrom (archaic; formal)
whereof (archaic; formal)
whereon (archaic; formal)
whither (archaic)
yonder (archaic; dialectal)

Conjunctive prepositions
but (archaic in uses such as "There wasn't one among them but would have taken my place.")

Postpositions
withal (archaic)

Complex prepositions
 at after (regional, England)
 down on (colloquial)
 ex relatione (law)
 hard by (archaic)
 inside of (colloquial; regional, Australia and U.S.)
 non obstante (law)
 nigh by (obsolete)
 opposite to (regional, Britain)

See also 
 Preposition and postposition
 Preposition stranding

Notes

References

External links
 Wiktionary list of English prepositions
 The Visual Guide to English Prepositions Part 1/2: Place & Direction (Infographic)
 The Visual Guide to English Prepositions Part 2/2: Time (Infographic)

English grammar